Suzanne Garment  (née  Bloom) is an American scholar, writer, editor and attorney.

Garment is best known for her book, Scandal: The Culture of Mistrust in American Politics, and for her work as an aide to Ambassador Daniel Patrick Moynihan working to block the 1975 United Nations General Assembly Resolution 3379 of the United Nations that "Zionism is a form of racism and racial discrimination."

Education and career

Garment holds the A.B. from Radcliffe College, the M.A. from the  University of Sussex in the United Kingdom, the PhD in political science from  Harvard University, the J.D. and a master of laws degree in taxation from Georgetown University

She has served as  a visiting scholar at the Indiana University Center on Philanthropy at Indiana University; special counsel to Richard Ravitch, New York Lieutenant Governor  and as counsel to the Task Force on the State Budget Crisis, co-chaired by Ravitch and former Federal Reserve chairman Paul Volcker. Before earning the J.D., she was a scholar at the American Enterprise Institute;  associate editorial page editor of the Wall Street Journal; author of the  "Capital Chronicle" column at the Wall Street Journal; and  special assistant to Daniel Patrick Moynihan, U.S. ambassador to the United Nations. Garment  has taught politics and public policy at  Yale and Harvard Universities.   She was the executive editor of  Jewish Ideas Daily.

Personal life
She was married to Leonard Garment, they have a daughter, Ann.

Books

Scandal: The Culture of Mistrust in American Politics (Anchor; 1991) 
A Dangerous Place co-author with  Daniel P. Moynihan (Little Brown)

References

External links

Yale University faculty
Jewish American writers
Living people
Year of birth missing (living people)
Radcliffe College alumni
Georgetown University Law Center alumni
Alumni of the University of Sussex
American editors
21st-century American Jews